The 1972 UNLV Rebels football team was an American football team that represented the University of Nevada, Las Vegas as an independent during the 1972 NCAA College Division football season. In the fifth year of the football program, all under head coach Bill Ireland, the Rebels compiled a 1–10 record.

Las Vegas Stadium debuted the previous October, but its dedication game was this year's opener on September 9 against .

Following the season, Ireland stepped down and became the athletic director; he was succeeded as head coach by Ron Meyer.

Schedule

References

UNLV
UNLV Rebels football seasons
UNLV Rebels football